David Pulkrábek (born 30 October 1993) is a Czech judoka. 

He is the bronze medallist of the 2018 Judo Grand Prix Zagreb in the –60 kg category.

References

External links
 

1993 births
Living people
Czech male judoka
Judoka at the 2010 Summer Youth Olympics
Youth Olympic gold medalists for the Czech Republic